Mind Cage may refer to:

The Mind Cage, a 1957 science fiction novel by Canadian-American writer A. E. Van Vogt
Mind Cage (film), a 2016 Cambodian horror film starring Sarita Reth

See also
 Mindcage (disambiguation)